Solanum arcanum is a species of nightshade, commonly called the "wild tomato," endemic to Peru.

Description

Its leaves are interrupted imparipinnate, green to pale beneath, glabrous to sparsely short pubescent with a mixture of simple uniseriate trichomes, some populations lacking trichomes.

Buds are conical, straight, approximately half way exerted from the calyx.

Seeds are obovate, narrowly winged at the apex and acute at the base, pale brown, pubescent with hair-like outgrowths of the tegument cell radial walls, which give the surface a silky appearance. Chromosome number: n=12.

Distribution
It is found in coastal and inland Andean valleys in northern Peru (between ).

References

Further reading

arcanum
Endemic flora of Peru
Plants described in 2005